Jonathan Charles Rauch (born April 26, 1960) is an American author, journalist, and activist. After graduating from Yale University, Rauch worked at the Winston-Salem Journal in North Carolina, for National Journal, and later for The Economist and as a freelance writer. He is currently a senior fellow in governance studies at the Brookings Institution and a contributing editor of The Atlantic.

He is the author of books and articles on public policy, culture, and economics. His books include The Happiness Curve: Why Life Gets Better After 50 (2018), Gay Marriage: Why It Is Good for Gays, Good for Straights, and Good for America (2004); Government's End: Why Washington Stopped Working (2000); and Kindly Inquisitors: The New Attacks on Free Thought (1993; revised second edition in 2013). In 2015, he published a short ebook, Political Realism, arguing that overzealous efforts to clean up politics have hampered the ability of political parties and professionals to order politics and build governing coalitions. In 2021, Rauch released The Constitution of Knowledge: A Defense of Truth describing the erosion of our epistemic commons, the cost to U.S. democracy, and offering solutions.

Writings and beliefs
A critic of U.S. government public policy in general, including its relation to LGBTQ+ people, Rauch has pursued gay-related topics as an openly gay author (he did not realize he was gay until after he finished college) since 1991 when he spoke out against hate crime laws in The New Republic. He is an avid proponent of same-sex marriage, which he believes improves the quality of life of both LGBTQ+ people and married heterosexuals. He co-authored an op-ed article in The New York Times that proposed the compromise of nationally recognized civil unions for gay couples, which he did with the goal of "reconciliation" with religious opponents of same-sex marriage.

Peter Wehner, conservative writer and director of the Bush-era Office of Strategic Initiatives, has called Rauch "the most formidable and persuasive voice for same-sex marriage."

Rauch is also well known for an article he wrote in The Atlantic in March 2003, entitled "Caring for Your Introvert: The habits and needs of a little-understood group". In this article, Rauch described his own experiences as an introvert, and how being an introvert has affected his own life. For many introverts, his piece became a long sought after explanation of their own personality traits. For a period of years, Rauch's original article drew more traffic to The Atlantic Monthly site than any other article.

In terms of political philosophy, Rauch has referred to himself as "an admirer of James Madison and Edmund Burke" and a "radical incrementalist," meaning one who favors "revolutionary change on a geological time scale." He has also summarized Burke's views, and his views, in that "utopianism and perfectionism, however well intended, should never displace reasonable caution in making social policy... It's much easier to damage society... than to repair it."

He has in the past described himself as "an unrepentantly atheistic Jewish homosexual". He defines his view as apatheism, in which he respects other people's choices of religiosity or absence of religion without making a big deal of them. He contrasts this with American atheists who seek to evangelize and convert people away from religion, actions that he is critical of.

In political science and economics, Rauch is known for coining and promoting the term "demosclerosis" as "government's progressive loss of the ability to adapt"—a process in which specific benefits, going to special interests, bill the common taxpayer, which uses the medical term sclerosis to apply to government drift. He is a critic of communism, calling it "the deadliest fantasy in human history".

Bibliography

References

External links
 JonathanRauch.com His own web site, including archived articles.
 
 Articles by Jonathan Rauch at Prospect Magazine
 Video of debate between Rauch and David Blankenhorn on the issue of gay marriage on Bloggingheads.tv
 Poynter.org "New York Times correction: Hell is not other people at breakfast". Craig Silverman. (March 28, 2012)
 

1960 births
Living people
American columnists
The Atlantic (magazine) people
American gay writers
Jewish American writers
LGBT Jews
American LGBT rights activists
Yale University alumni
Writers from Phoenix, Arizona
LGBT people from Arizona
20th-century American non-fiction writers
20th-century American male writers
21st-century American non-fiction writers
21st-century American male writers
21st-century American Jews
Brookings Institution people